Roman Olehovych Yaremchuk (born 27 November 1995) is a Ukrainian professional footballer who plays as a striker for Belgian Pro League side Club Brugge and the Ukraine national team.

After coming through Dynamo Kyiv's youth academy, Yaremchuk began playing for the club's reserve side in 2013 and was promoted to the first team two years later. He was subsequently loaned to fellow Ukrainian side Oleksandriya during the 2016–17 season, before moving to Belgian side Gent in 2018. A year later, he moved to Benfica in a transfer worth €18.5 million, before returning to Belgium the following season, to sign for Club Brugge for a transfer worth €16 million.

After representing Ukraine at various youth levels, Yaremchuk was called up to the full international side for the first time in September 2018, and played at UEFA Euro 2020.

Club career

Dynamo Kyiv

Early career
Yaremchuk is a product of Karpaty Lviv and Dynamo Kyiv academies. His first coaches were Mykola Dudarenko in Karpaty and Oleksiy Drotsenko in FC Dynamo. On 6 September 2008, he made his debut for Dynamo in Ukrainian National Youth Competition against FC Yunist Chernihiv and scored twice, finishing the season with 21 appearances and 10 goals. He made his debut for FC Dynamo-2 as a second-half substitute against Desna Chernihiv on 14 July 2013 in the Ukrainian First League.

Loan to Oleksandriya
While playing for Oleksandriya in October 2016, Yaremchuk was the first player selected as player of the month in the Ukrainian Premier League. He scored the fastest goal in the history of the league, after seven seconds on 31 October, in a 2–2 draw against Vorskla Poltava.

Gent
In August 2017, Yaremchuk signed a four-year contract with Gent in the Belgian First Division A. He made his debut on 27 August, coming on as an 86th-minute substitute for Mamadou Sylla in a 0–0 home draw with Anderlecht, and scored his first goal on 3 November 2017 in a 1–0 home victory over Standard Liège.

In the 2019–20 UEFA Europa League, Yaremchuk scored three goals for Gent in the group stages, including a brace against VfL Wolfsburg on 24 October, before being eliminated in the  round of 32 to Roma 2–1 on aggregate. On 20 January 2020, he had a surgery on an injured Achilles tendon. The recovery was estimated to take two to three months, ruling him out for the rest of the season.

During the 2020–21 campaign, Yaremchuk featured in 34 games and ended the season with a career-best 20 league goals and seven assists, including two hat-tricks against Waasland-Beveren on 1 November and Mouscron on 15 February in the regular season. On 15 November 2020, he tested positive for COVID-19.

Benfica 

On 31 July 2021, Benfica announced the signing of Yaremchuk on a five-year deal worth €18.5 million for 75% of his economic rights. He made his debut on 10 August, creating Benfica's second goal in the 2–0 home victory over Spartak Moscow in the third qualifying round of the UEFA Champions League. Four days later, he made his debut in the Primeira Liga, scoring in a 2–0 home victory over Arouca, and netted a brace in a 3–1 away victory over Vitória de Guimarães. The following matches, Yaremchuk struggled to score goals, being 10 matches scoreless, before scoring his first goal in over three months, the opening goal for Benfica in a 2–0 home victory over his former club Dynamo Kyiv in the club's last UEFA Champions League group match, ensuring his teams' qualification to the round of sixteen.

On 23 February 2022, Yaremchuk scored the equaliser in a 2–2 home draw against Ajax, in the first leg of the round of 16 tie of the Champions League. Yaremchuk celebrated his goal by unveiling a shirt with Ukraine's coat of arms on it, as way of supporting his nation amid the previous day's invasion by Russia. Four days later, after coming on as a 62nd-minute substitute for Darwin Núñez, he received the club's captain armband by Jan Vertonghen, before receiving a standing ovation from Benfica's supporters, due to his country's invasion, during a 3–0 home victory against Vitória de Guimarães. On 13 April, he scored Benfica's second goal in a 3–3 draw against Liverpool in the second leg of the quarter-finals tie, while his team lost 6–4 on aggregate.

Club Brugge
On 29 August 2022, Club Brugge announced the signing of Yaremchuk on a 4 year deal for a transfer fee of €16 million, plus €3 million in add-ons, with Benfica also receiving 10% of a future transfer, in case Club Brugge receive an offer equal or superior to €10 million.

International career
Yaremchuk represented Ukraine at under-16, under-17, under-18, under-19, under-20 and under-21 levels, for a total of 33 youth caps and scoring 4 goals overall. With the under-20s, he participated in the 2015 FIFA U-20 World Cup, helping Ukraine to a round of 16 finish, after losing to Senegal in a penalty shootout.

He made his senior international debut on 9 September 2018 in a UEFA Nations League group stage match against the Czech Republic, which Ukraine won 2–1. He scored his first goal for the national team and provided an assist on 7 June 2019, in a 5–0 win against Serbia in the UEFA Euro 2020 qualifiers. On 14 October, he scored from close range after an initial save from Rui Patrício, to help Ukraine to a 2–1 home win over reigning European champions Portugal, ensuring his team qualification to the 2020 UEFA European Championship, at top of their group. In their last qualifier, he scored on 17 November in a 2–2 away draw against Serbia in Belgrade.

Yaremchuk was included in the squad for Euro 2020. In their first group stage match, he assisted the first and scored the second goal in a 3–2 loss against the Netherlands at Johan Cruyff Arena in Amsterdam, and scored in a 2–1 win against North Macedonia at Arena Națională in Bucharest. After finishing as one of the best third-placed teams, Ukraine was eventually eliminated in the quarter-finals by England on 3 July, after a 4–0 loss at Stadio Olimpico in Rome.

Personal life
Yaremchuk married Christina in 2017. Their son was born in 2019. In 2022, following Ukraine's invasion by Russia, Yaremchuck asked fellow Ukraine national teammate Andriy Yarmolenko to help save his wife's parents. Yaremchuck revealed the situation was critical and he didn't even know what to do, so he turned to Andriy Yarmolenko, knowing that he was from Chernihiv, and he helped him and days later his wife's parents were rescued.

Outside of professional football
In 2022, Yaremchuk  raised a fairly large sum for the Armed Forces of Ukraine, in particular for the defenders of Chernihiv, and delivered bulletproof vests for the city.

Career statistics

Club

International

As of match played 27 September 2022. Ukraine score listed first, score column indicates score after each Yaremchuk goal.

Honours
Benfica
Taça da Liga runner-up: 2021–22

Individual
 Ukrainian Premier League Player of the Month: October 2016

References

External links 

 
 

1995 births
Living people
Sportspeople from Lviv
Ukrainian footballers
Association football forwards
Ukraine international footballers
Ukraine youth international footballers
UEFA Euro 2020 players
Ukrainian Premier League players
Ukrainian First League players
Belgian Pro League players
Primeira Liga players
FC Dynamo Kyiv players
FC Dynamo-2 Kyiv players
FC Oleksandriya players
K.A.A. Gent players
S.L. Benfica footballers
Club Brugge KV players
Ukrainian expatriate footballers
Expatriate footballers in Belgium
Ukrainian expatriate sportspeople in Belgium
Expatriate footballers in Portugal
Ukrainian expatriate sportspeople in Portugal